Piedras River may refer to:

 Piedras River (San Juan, Puerto Rico)
Piedras River (Utuado, Puerto Rico)
 Piedras River (Costa Rica)
 Piedras River (Peru)